The Doll's House is a 2013 book by British author Tania Carver.

Synopsis
The book centres on the discovery of a dead pre-transition male-to-female transgender individual on a council housing estate in Birmingham. The inside of the house is like a doll's house with pink ribbons and pink walls, stuffed toys and the table set for a tea party
DI Phil Brennan on the Major Incident Squad begins investigating the puzzling case.

Reception
Author Mark Billingham described the book as 'seriously scary'. In Female First the reviewer wrote 'This book was full of psychopaths, gory murder scenes and scandal and I loved it.  I ended up goading myself to read “just a few more pages” all the way. through' In Mystery Tribune the bok was 'recommended for ones looking for psychological thrillers' while 
The book was also reviewed in Publishers Weekly.

References

2013 British novels
British thriller novels
British crime novels
Psychological thriller novels
British LGBT novels
Novels with transgender themes
Novels set in Birmingham, West Midlands
Sphere Books books